Hingorani is a surname. It may refer to:

Arjun Hingorani (1926-2018), Indian Bollywood director and producer
Dinesh Hingorani, or Dinesh Hingoo, Indian Bollywood actor 
Kapila Hingorani, Indian lawyer regarded as "Mother of Public Interest Litigation" (PIL)
Vera Hingorani, Indian gynaecologist, obstetrician, medical writer
Vicky Hingorani, Indian Bombay based Lawyer,